The 2012 UK Open Qualifier 3 was the third of eight 2012 UK Open Darts Qualifiers which was held at the Metrodome in Barnsley on Saturday 24 March.

Prize money

Draw

References

3